The Centre of New Industries and Technologies (French: Centre des nouvelles industries et technologies, abbreviated CNIT), located in Puteaux, France, is the first building ever to be developed in La Défense, west of Paris, France. It functions as a convention centre, though it also houses shops and offices such as Fnac (a media and electronics retailer found throughout France), ESSEC Business School campus for executive education, as well as a Hilton hotel.

Its characteristic shape is due to the triangular plot it occupies, replacing the old Zodiac factories, on the territory of Puteaux. Opened in 1958, the CNIT underwent two restructurings, in 1988 and 2009. It is managed by the company Viparis.

History
The initial construction of the building took place between 1957 and 1958, with the first concrete poured on May 8.  Its architects were Robert Camelot, Jean de Mailly, Bernard Zehrfuss accompanied by the engineer Jean Prouvé for the exterior. The structural engineer for the concrete shell was Nicolas Esquillan.

At the time of its construction, the La Defense business district did not exist and the site for the building was at the roundabout or "rond point" of La Defense where the old Zodiac Aerospace factory was situated. The site was named for a statue called "La Défense de Paris" by the sculptor Louis-Ernest Barrias which was situated on a natural hill between the towns of Puteaux and Courbevoie. This statue, originally erected in 1883, has now been moved to the west of the La Defense plaza.

Originally conceived as an exhibition center for the French machine tools industry, the building was inaugurated by General, and soon to be president, Charles de Gaulle on 12 September 1958.

Construction of the La Defense plaza
In 1978 a great plaza was constructed next to the site of the CNIT building. The newly raised pedestrian precinct covered the railway station, all of the tracks and a good third of the height of the CNIT building. The entrance ways, characterized by rectangular blocks, were removed.

The La Defense plaza now covers a large area to the south of this building and is three stories above ground level.

1988 restructuring
During 1988 the space covered by the CNIT building was completely emptied and refurbished to encompass 200,000 square metres instead of the initial 100,000 square meters. Only the vault was retained from the original construction. The internal structure which now contained new offices and a luxury hotel (currently the Paris La Defense Hilton) were radically changed.

2009 refurbishment
A major refurbishment of the CNIT was finished in summer 2009, increasing the public space within the building by the re-opening of the lower floor which now contains new shops and restaurants. During this work, some of the more esthetic features of the 1988 redesign, including the striking triangular door handles that copied the shape of the building were lost to more modern but otherwise unremarkable fittings.

Architecture & Engineering
This building is notable for being the largest unsupported concrete span enclosed space in the world. Situated on the northern side of the La Defense plaza, this is one of the most eye catching buildings in modern architecture, being constructed of reinforced concrete in an innovative double shelled design with internal ribs.

Internally, the impressive vaulted roof is entirely unencumbered by columns or girders and the buildings within the space provide no structural support whatsoever, seeming rather to hang from the span itself.

References

External links
 Official website

Buildings and structures completed in 1958
Convention centers in France
Buildings and structures in Hauts-de-Seine
La Défense
20th-century architecture in France